Chinese Tuxedo was a two story Chinese restaurant on Doyers Street in Chinatown, Manhattan.  An upscale restaurant opened in 1897, they closed in the mid-1900s.

References

Chinatown, Manhattan
Chinese restaurants in New York (state)